The Life Regiment of Horse was refer too:

Life Regiment of Horse (1667–1791), a Swedish Army cavalry unit
Life Regiment of Horse (1928–1949), a Swedish Army cavalry unit